Elden C. Bailey, (April 22, 1922 – April 13, 2004) was an American percussionist.

1922 births
New England Conservatory alumni
Classical percussionists
1992 deaths
20th-century classical musicians
20th-century American musicians